Guidouma is a small town in Tsamba-Magotsi Department of Ngounié Province, in western Gabon. 

It lies on the N1 road.

References
Maplandia World Gazetteer

Populated places in Ngounié Province